The regions of Kyrgyzstan are divided into districts (raions), administered by government-appointed officials. Rural communities consisting of up to twenty small settlements have their own elected mayors and councils. The raions are listed below, by region:

North Kyrgyzstan

Bishkek City
The capital city of Bishkek has the status of region and is divided into four districts:

Chüy Region
Chüy Region is divided administratively into 8 districts:

Issyk-Kul Region
Issyk-Kul Region is divided administratively into 5 districts:

Naryn Region
Naryn Region is divided administratively into 5 districts:

Talas Region
Talas Region is divided administratively into 4 districts:

South Kyrgyzstan

Batken Region
Batken Region is divided administratively into 3 districts:

Jalal-Abad Region
Jalal-Abad Region is divided administratively into 8 districts:

Osh Region
Osh Region is divided administratively into 7 districts:

See also
Regions of Kyrgyzstan

References

External links
Statoids
Kyrgyzstan: Regions, districts, district capitals 

 
Subdivisions of Kyrgyzstan
Kyrgyzstan 2
Kyrgyzstan 2
Districts, Kyrgyzstan
Kyrgyzstan geography-related lists